The 2014–15 Blackwater Elite season was the first season of the franchise in the Philippine Basketball Association (PBA).

Key dates
July 18: The 2014 PBA Expansion Draft took place in Microtel Acropolis, in Libis, Quezon City.
August 24: The 2014 PBA Draft took place in Midtown Atrium, Robinson Place Manila.

Expansion draft picks

Draft picks

Roster

Philippine Cup

Eliminations

Standings

Game log

Playoffs

Bracket

Commissioner's Cup

Eliminations

Standings

Game log

Playoffs

Bracket

Transactions

Trades

Pre-season

Commissioner's Cup

Governors' Cup

Recruited imports

References

Blackwater Bossing seasons
Blackwater